Agavva is an old and rare Russian Christian male first name. It is supposedly derived from the Biblical Hebrew word hāgāb, meaning locust.

Its diminutives are Aga, Agakha, and Agasha.

The patronymics derived from "Agavva" are "" (Agavvich; masculine) and "" (Agavvichna; feminine).

See also
Agav

References

Notes

Sources
Н. А. Петровский (N. A. Petrovsky). "Словарь русских личных имён" (Dictionary of Russian First Names). ООО Издательство "АСТ". Москва, 2005. 
А. В. Суперанская (A. V. Superanskaya). "Современный словарь личных имён: Сравнение. Происхождение. Написание" (Modern Dictionary of First Names: Comparison. Origins. Spelling). Айрис-пресс. Москва, 2005. 

